2019 Ukrainian Athletics Indoor Championships among the athletes of the senior age category were held from 7 to 9 February in Sumy at the Athletics Indoor Arena of Sumy State University.

Medalists

Men

Women

Live stream 

Ukrainian Athletics streamed all events live:

See also 

 2019 Ukrainian Athletics Championships

References

External links 

 2019 Ukrainian Athletics Indoor Championships' web-page  on the Ukrainian Athletics's web-site 

Ukrainian Indoor Athletics Championships
Ukrainian Athletics Indoor Championships
Ukrainian Athletics Indoor Championships
Sport in Sumy